Elaine Karen Holt (born 5 June 1966) is a British businesswoman.

Early life
Holt was born in Oxford and attended Stroud High School, where she gained no O-levels. She did not join the sixth-form, and her headmistress said to her "All you will ever be is a hairdresser".

Career
Holt worked for British Airways from 1987 before holding various roles at FirstGroup and becoming managing director of First Capital Connect in 2006. From 2009 until 2011 she served as chief executive of Directly Operated Railways and chairman of East Coast. She subsequently led National Express's bid for the Greater Western franchise, RATP Group's bid for Crossrail and Eurostar/Keolis's bid for the InterCity East Coast franchise.

She became a non-executive director of Highways England in 2014.

Personal life
She is married to Steve Holt.

References

External links

1966 births
British rail transport chief executives
British women business executives
English chief executives
People educated at Stroud High School
People from Stroud
British women chief executives
Living people